Cychrus luhuo is a species of ground beetle in the subfamily of Carabinae. It was described by Deuve in 1994.

References

luhuo
Beetles described in 1994